Abner Felipe Souza de Almeida (born 30 May 1996), simply known as Abner, is a Brazilian professional footballer who plays as a left-back for Farense.

Club career

Coritiba
Born in Londrina, Paraná, Abner finished his formation with Coritiba, after joining the club in 2011 from PSTC. On 3 June 2012, he agreed to a three-year contract, his first professional link. On 18 September 2013, at the age of 17, he made his first team – and Série A – debut, coming on as a second-half substitute for Sergio Escudero in a 2–2 home draw against Goiás; it was his only appearance for the club.

In October 2013, shortly after making his professional debut, Abner suffered a serious knee injury, being sidelined for six months. Subsequently, the 40% of his rights belonging to Coxa were sold to a group of businessman, and were assigned to PSTC (which already had 40% of the player).

Real Madrid
On 23 July 2014, despite long standing interest from Italian giants Roma, Abner signed for Real Madrid and was assigned to the reserves in Segunda División B. He made his debut for Castilla on 8 August, replacing Javi Noblejas late into a 2–1 loss at Atlético Madrid B.

On 5 September 2014, after only one further match for the B-team, Abner again suffered the same knee injury from the previous year, being sidelined for the campaign. The following 10 July, now fully recovered, he was called up to the main squad by manager Rafa Benítez to feature in the pre-season tours in Australia and China; six days later, however, he was cut from the squad after suffering a setback from his injury.

Abner returned to the fields on 20 September 2015, playing 20 minutes in a 1–0 loss at Real Unión; three days later, he again suffered a serious knee injury during training, being again out for the season. After his third injury, he stated that he "considered leaving football", but Zinedine Zidane, at the time the Castilla manager, encouraged him to keep going.

In 2016–17, Abner managed to feature in 21 league matches without setbacks, as Castilla finished in a disappointing 11th position.

Loan to Estoril
On 20 August 2017, Abner was loaned to Primeira Liga side Estoril, for one year. He made his top tier debut on 10 September, starting in a 2–0 away defeat to Moreirense.

On 26 February 2018, after just ten league matches, Abner's loan was cancelled.

Coritiba return
On 3 April 2018, Abner returned to his first club Coritiba on loan from Real Madrid, until 30 June. On 20 July, he extended his link until the end of the year, but opted to leave on 8 December, after 19 league appearances.

Athletico Paranaense
On 8 March 2019, Abner was presented at Athletico Paranaense, after agreeing to a loan deal until the end of the year; he was initially assigned to the under-23 squad for the year's Campeonato Paranaense.

International career
Abner represented Brazil at under-17 level at the 2013 South American U-17 Championship and at the 2013 FIFA U-17 World Cup in the United Arab Emirates. At the latter tournament, he suffered the first of his three knee injuries in a match against Honduras.

Career statistics

References

External links

Real Madrid profile

1996 births
Living people
Brazilian footballers
Brazilian expatriate footballers
Brazil youth international footballers
Association football defenders
Sportspeople from Londrina
Campeonato Brasileiro Série A players
Campeonato Brasileiro Série B players
Paraná Soccer Technical Center players
Coritiba Foot Ball Club players
Club Athletico Paranaense players
Segunda División B players
Real Madrid Castilla footballers
Primeira Liga players
G.D. Estoril Praia players
S.C. Farense players
Brazilian expatriate sportspeople in Spain
Brazilian expatriate sportspeople in Portugal
Expatriate footballers in Spain
Expatriate footballers in Portugal